Zhāng Shūqí (Chinese: 张书旗; 1901 — 1957) was a Chinese painter from Zhejiang, noted for painting flowers and birds.

Biography 
He studied at Shanghai under Liu Haisu. For a time he taught at the National Center University. From 1942 to 1946, he lived in the United States. After that, he returned to China for a time, but ultimately settled in the US.

His works are held in the Art Gallery of Greater Victoria, the Ashmolean Museum and Stanford University.

He is the father of Gordon H. Chang, Professor of History at Stanford University.

References

External links
China Page of his works

1901 births
1957 deaths
Republic of China painters
20th-century American painters
American male painters
Painters from Zhejiang
Artists from Hangzhou
20th-century American male artists